Ireneo Affò (born Davide, 10 December 1741 – 14 May 1797) was an Italian art historian, writer, numismatist and Franciscan friar.

Life 
Affò was born in Busseto in the province of Parma, in the region of Emilia-Romagna. Observing his early inclination for drawing and poetry, Affò's father encouraged him to study in the workshop of the painter and sculptor, Pietro Balestra. After a short time, Affò began pursuing studies in fine arts, demonstrating abilities in the writing.

In his youth, Affò entered the Franciscan order. He continued to pursue his writing, which included poetry. He began to cultivate the study of learning, conducting extensive historical research of Italy and the surrounding area.

Ferdinand, Duke of Parma sent Affò to serve as a professor of philosophy at Guastalla in 1768, where he oversaw the publication of two ancient codices, including Angelo Poliziano's Orpheus, and the newly discovered archive of the Holy Spirit in Reggio Emilia. He then edited the critical edition of poetic works of St. Francis of Assisi. His major work in the literary field is still represented by the first five volumes of Memoirs of writers and scholars of Parma (1789 – 1797). While at Guastalla, Affò wrote his History of the city and duchy of Guastalla. He wrote also, History of Parma, until 1346, as well as other works connected with the ancient history of Italy. Affò's writing became highly respected throughout Italy.

In 1778, Affò was recalled to Parma to become deputy librarian for the court. In 1785, he became director of the Palatine Library in that city, replacing Paolo Maria Paciaudi, and later became historiographer of the Journal of the Duchy and honorary Professor of History at the university. While his writing covered a wide variety of subjects, his research was uncannily accurate and valued at the library. In 1792, Affò  began publishing the four volumes of the History of Parma.

He died at the age of 56, in the convent of Busseto, when he contracted typhus fever. He left a manuscript History of Peter Louis Farnese. Girolamo Tiraboschi, an Italian literary critic and historian of Italian literature often quotes his works. His Poetical Dictionary and Memoirs, as well as other pieces are inserted in the Raccolta Ferrarese di Opuscoli.

Writings 

 (Biography of the librarian of Matthias Corvinus, King of Hungary.)

 (Biography of Bernardino Baldi, first abbott of Guastalla)

 (Biography of Pier Luigi Farnese, Duke of Parma.)
 (Cavaliere Bernardino Marliani)

 (Biography of Francesco Mazzola, Parmigianino)
 (Live of the Blessed Orlando de Medici, and cult of his relics)
 (Biography of Vespasiano I Gonzaga)
Ireneo Affò (1794) Ragionamento Del Padre, Parma: Dalla Stamperia Carmignani. Dedicated to Clothilde Tambroni.
 (History of Parma)

References
This article incorporates text from A New General Biographical Dictionary (1857) by Hugh James Rose and Henry John Rose, a publication now in the public domain.

External links 
 

1741 births
1797 deaths
People from Busseto
18th-century Italian historians
Italian librarians
Italian Friars Minor